Fidel Bassa (born 18 December 1962 in El Retén, Colombia), is a former professional boxer. Bassa is owner and manager of Mundo Científico, a provider of educational technology and telecommunications company  based in Bogota, Colombia.

He was WBA Flyweight Champion from 13 February 1987 until 30 September 1989. He won the title after defeating Hilario Zapata, and was finally defeated by Jesús Kiki Rojas.

He is remembered for his epic title fights against Dave McAuley in The King's Hall, Belfast in 1987 and 1988.

See also 
 List of flyweight boxing champions

References

External links
 

1962 births
Living people
Flyweight boxers
World flyweight boxing champions
World Boxing Association champions
Colombian male boxers
Sportspeople from Magdalena Department